Dubhghall mac Suibhne (fl. 1232×1241 – 1262) was a Scottish landholder in Argyll, and a leading member of Clann Suibhne. He was a son of Suibhne mac Duinn Shléibhe, and appears to have held lordship of Knapdale from at least the 1240s to the 1260s, and may have initiated the construction of Skipness Castle and Lochranza Castle.

During Dubhghall's career, Clann Suibhne fell prey to the Stewarts, one of Scotland's most powerful families. By the 1240s, the Stewarts appear to have gained lordship in the Firth of Clyde and Cowal, whilst Alexander II, King of Scotland attempted to extend royal authority into Argyll and the Isles. It is in the context of this Scottish encroachment into Argyll that Dubhghall first appears on record, in an appeal to Pope Innocent IV for papal protection in 1247.

Although Alexander II's campaign to annex Argyll and the Isles came to an immediate halt on his death in 1249, his son and successor, Alexander III, renewed hostilities in the 1260s. By this time, it was Walter Stewart, Earl of Menteith who spearheaded the Stewarts' westward advance. Charter evidence dating to 1261 and 1262 reveals that Dubhghall resigned the Clann Suibhne lordship into Walter Stewart's hands. Whether this transfer was the result of a military operation against Clann Suibhne is unknown. The fact that some members of the kindred were unwilling to subject themselves to Stewart domination is evinced by the ensuing career of Dubhghall's nephew, Murchadh Mac Suibhne.

Family

Dubhghall was a son of Suibhne mac Duinn Shléibhe, eponymous ancestor of Clann Suibhne. According to the eighteenth-century Craignish History, a daughter of Dubhghall married a member of the Craignish branch of the Caimbéalaigh kindred (the Campbells). Dubhghall's son-in-law, a man also named Dubhghall, is identified by the Craignish History as the third of the name to represent the Craignish Caimbéalaigh. The succeeding son of this couple is further stated by this source to have been named Dubhghall, and is elsewhere attested as an historical landholder in Argyll.

The Clann Suibhne lordship appears to have stretched across Knapdale, from the Sound of Jura to Loch Fyne, and further extended across the Kilbrannan Sound, from Skipness to Arran.

Dubhghall's father may have built Castle Sween in Knapdale. The fortress appears to date to the late twelfth century. As such, it is one of the oldest standing stone castles in Scotland.

Dubhghall's family appears to have constructed Skipness Castle as well. The original site seems to have consisted of two free-standing buildings: a two-storey residence with a lord's hall, and a single-storey chapel. This complex appears to have been surrounded by an earth and timber wall. The hall house and adjutant chapel may date to the first half of the thirteenth century. Skipness Castle is first recorded by a charter of Dubhghall dating to 1261. The site may have been a secondary residence to their main residence at Castle Sween, which could well have served as the power centre of the Clann Suibhne lordship.

In fact, it may have been Dubhghall who initiated construction of Skipness Castle. Clann Suibhne, and specifically Dubhghall himself, may have built Lochranza Castle on Arran as well. Although the visible ruins of the latter structure are those of a late mediaeval tower house, the original hall house appears to date to the thirteenth or fourteenth century. If the castle was indeed constructed by Clann Suibhe it would mean that the family possessed firm control over the Kilbrannan Sound.

Scottish encroachment in Argyll

One of the most powerful Scottish magnates of the reign of Alexander II, King of Scotland, was Walter fitz Alan II, Steward of Scotland, head of the Stewart kindred. The original power centre of Walter's familial ancestors was the lordship of Renfrew. By about 1200, during the career of Walter fitz Alan's father, Alan fitz Walter, Steward of Scotland, the Stewarts appear to have expanded into the Firth of Clyde and gained control of Bute. The family's authority over the island is specifically evidenced by a charter of Alan of the church of Kingarth and the entire parish on Bute to Paisley Abbey. The island's citadel, Rothesay Castle, may have been built by either Walter fitz Alan or his father in about 1200. As such, this Stewart fortress is contemporary to the Clann Suibhne stronghold Castle Sween. The westward expansion of Stewart power can be traced not only by the kindred's grants to Paisley Abbey—a religious house founded by the family's founder in the twelfth century—but also by grants to the abbey by native clans absorbed into the Stewart lordship.

Whilst it is possible that Alan expanded into Cowal as well, another possibility is that it was during the tenure of Walter fitz Alan that the family received a grant of Cowal. Charter evidence reveals that by about the time of the latter's death in 1241, Cowal had been brought under Stewart overlordship, and Scottish royal authority was further expanding into Argyll. Specific early evidence of this encroachment is preserved by a grant of Laghmann mac Maoil Choluim of the church of St Finan (Kilfinan) to Paisley Abbey in 1232×1241. Laghmann was evidently a close kinsman of Dubhghall, and Dubhghall himself is recorded as one of witnesses of the transaction.

In the 1230s, Alexander II interfered with the ecclesiastical affairs of Argyll. In 1236—presumably as a result of royal petition—the pope instructed the Bishop of Moray to secure a canonical election to select a new Bishop of Argyll, and by 1239 a Moravian dignitary named William served as Bishop of Argyll. After the drowning of this ecclesiast, authority over the see was given to Clement, Bishop of Dunblane. By 1248, the bishop—possibly at the behest of the king—seems to have sought to move the cathedral from Lismore onto the mainland. Further extension of royal authority is evidenced by the king's grant of a swathe of territory around Loch Awe and Loch Fyne to Giolla Easbuig Mac Giolla Chríost. This grant dates to 1 August 1240, and is the earliest infeftment of knight' service in the west Highlands.

In 1244, Alexander II attempted to purchase the Isles from the Norwegian Crown. The westward extension of Scottish royal authority may account for the records of Dubhghall and the monks of Iona requesting papal protection. For example, on 17 April 1247, Pope Innocent IV granted protection to Dubhghall and his possessions. Days later, on 22 April 1247, the pope moved to preserve the independence of the Islesmen by ordering the abbots of the order of St Benedict in Scotland—on behalf of the abbot and convent of Iona—not to compel the latter to come to the Benedictine general chapter. On the same day of this command, the pope also granted the Abbot of Iona the use of the ring and mitre to further ensure his ecclesiastical freedom. Earlier, on 20 March 1247, the pope confirmed a grant by Dubhghall to the church of St Colmán Ela (Kilcalmonell).

  
In 1248, Haraldr Óláfsson, King of Mann and the Isles, and his newly-wedded wife, Cecilía Hákonardóttir, were lost at sea whilst sailing from Norway to the Isles. Upon learning of the catastrophe, Cecilía's father, Hákon Hákonarson, King of Norway, immediately sent Eóghan Mac Dubhghaill to temporarily take up the kingship of the Isles on his behalf. In the summer of 1249, Alexander launched an invasion of Argyll, directed at the very heart of the Clann Dubhghaill lordship. There is reason to suspect that a cooling in relations between Eóghan and Alexander II, along with Haraldr's unexpected demise and the resultant kin-strife over this man's succession, along with Eóghan's acceptance of royal powers on Hákon's behalf, could all have spurred the Scots' offensive. In the course of the campaign, Alexander II demanded that Eóghan renounce his allegiance to Hákon, and ordered him to hand over certain mainland and island fortresses. Eóghan stubbornly refused, and the unfolding crisis only ended with the Scottish king's sudden death in July 1249.

Stewart overlordship in Argyll

About a decade after Alexander II's death, his son and royal successor, Alexander III, came of age and took steps to continue his father's expansion into Argyll and the Isles. Once again it was the Stewarts, this time in the person of Walter fitz Alan's son, Walter Stewart, Earl of Menteith, who spearheaded the westward campaign. Evidence of this push is preserved by the record of Clann Suibhne possessions granted away in the early 1260s.

For example, on 17 April 1261, Dubhghall, with the consent of his heir Eóin, granted the church of St Colmán Ela to Paisley Abbey, along with the chapel of St Columba near Skipness Castle. Dubhghall's grant is stated to have been made for the welfare of his soul, those of his ancestors, and those of his wives, Juliana and Johanna, and a condition of his grant is that he was to have been buried at Paisley.

Furthermore, a charter of Walter Stewart to Paisley Abbey, dating to 19 January 1262, confirms Dubhghall's grant to the abbey, and states that Dubhghall had earlier granted the lands of Skipness to Walter Stewart himself. Dubhghall is elsewhere stated to have granted Walter Stewart his lands to be held as a "free barony" for two-thirds of a knight's service in the king's army. One of these transferred territories is recorded as "duabus Ungyns MacCrunnel", a place name that corresponds to Dubghall's title "lord of the land of Macherummel", used by the papal protection granted to Dubhghall in 1247. Additional evidence of the Stewarts' takeover of the Clann Suibhne heartland includes the record of grants made by Walter Stewart of several Knapdale churches—the churches of St Abbán moccu Corbmaic (Keills Chapel), St Michael (Kilmichael of Inverlussa), and St Mary/St Máel Ruba (Kilmory Chapel)—to Kilwinning Abbey.

The circumstances surrounding of Dubhghall's contract with Walter Stewart are unclear. There are no other records regarding the allotment of Clann Suibhne lands during this period, and it is not known if the Stewarts or their allies had already established themselves in Knapdale.

The transactions involving Clann Suibhne reveal that the family was progressively deprived of its territories. Whether the charters are evidence of a military invasion is unknown. The creation of a Stewart lordship in the region may have been undertaken in the context of extending Scottish royal authority into Argyll and the Isles. From the perspective of both the Stewarts and the Scottish Crown, Clann Suibhne seems to have represented a significant threat to regional stability. The removal or destruction of such families appears to represent part of a strategy to not only dislodge unpalatable kindreds (like Clann Suibhne), but to also forge new partnerships with more loyal kindreds (like Clann Dubhghaill and Clann Domhnaill), and extend the power of committed agents of the Scottish Crown (like the Stewarts).

Clann Suibhne's power in Knapdale and Kintyre appears to have ended by the 1260s, with the family being replaced by the Stewarts. The transition of power certainly seems to have marked an increase in Scottish authority in Argyll, and may have been a factor in Eóghan's remarkable refusal to assist Hákon against the Scottish Crown later that decade. The fact that members of Clann Suibhne were unwilling to subject themselves to Stewart domination is evinced by the subsequent record of Dubhghall's nephew, Murchadh Mac Suibhne, supporting the Norwegian cause.

See also
Eóin Mac Suibhne, a fourteenth-century descendant of Dubhghall's nephew, Murchadh, who attempted to retake the Clann Suibhne ancestral lands in Argyll

Notes

Citations

References

Primary sources

Secondary sources

External links

13th-century Scottish people
Medieval Gaels from Scotland
People from Argyll and Bute
People of the Kingdom of the Isles
Year of birth unknown
Year of death unknown